|}

The St James's Place Festival Hunters' Chase is a National Hunt steeplechase in Great Britain for amateur riders which is open to horses aged five years or older. It is run on the New Course at Cheltenham over a distance of about 3 miles and 2½ furlongs (3 miles 2 furlongs and 70 yards, or 5,294 metres), and during its running there are twenty-two fences to be jumped. It is scheduled to take place each year during the Cheltenham Festival in March.

The event is contested over the same course and distance as the Cheltenham Gold Cup, and it is sometimes referred to as the "amateur Gold Cup". It was established in 1904, and the inaugural running was won by Palmy Boy. It was backed by the insurance company Sun Alliance and London in 1972 and 1973, and for the following five years it was run without a sponsor. The art auctioneers Christie's supported the race from 1979 to 2012 and from 2013 to 2015 it was sponsored by the Country Gentleman's Association. Since 2016 it has been sponsored by St. James's Place plc. The race's full title is the St. James’s Place Festival Challenge Cup Open Hunters’ Chase. Until 2020 the race was known as the St James's Place Foxhunters' Chase - the word "fox" was removed from the title prior to the 2021 running.

Qualification for entry in the Festival Hunter Chase is based on a horse's previous performances in certain types of race within a specific period. To be eligible a horse must have finished first or second twice in hunter chases, or have won two open point-to-point races, or have won one open point-to-point race and finished first or second in a hunter chase.

Only professional jockeys competed in the 2021 running as amateur riders were excluded from the Cheltenham Festival due to restrictions on grassroots sport for the COVID-19 pandemic in the United Kingdom.

Records
Most successful horse since 1946 (2 wins):
 The Callant – 1956, 1957
 Whinstone Hill – 1958, 1960
  Master – 1961, 1962
 Double Silk – 1993, 1994
 Fantus – 1995, 1997
 Earthmover – 1998, 2004
 Salsify – 2012, 2013
 On The Fringe – 2015, 2016
 Pacha du Polder – 2017, 2018

Leading jockey since 1946 (3 wins):
 Colman Sweeney –  Sleeping Night (2005), Salsify (2012, 2013),

Leading trainer since 1946 (4 wins):
 Richard Barber – Rushing Wild (1992), Fantus (1995, 1997), Earthmover (1998)
 Paul Nicholls – Earthmover (2004), Sleeping Night (2005), Pacha du Polder (2017, 2018)

Winners since 1946
 All amateur jockeys except in 2021.

See also
 Horse racing in Great Britain
 List of British National Hunt races
 Recurring sporting events established in 1904  – this race is included under the title Foxhunter Chase.

References

 Racing Post:
 pedigreequery.com – Foxhunter Chase – Cheltenham.
 pointtopoint.co.uk – Point-to-Point and Hunter Chase Race Planner 2009/10.
 racenewsonline.co.uk – Racenews Archive (28 February 2008).

External links
 Race Recordings 

National Hunt races in Great Britain
Cheltenham Racecourse
National Hunt chases
Recurring sporting events established in 1904
1904 establishments in England